"Hold Me Now" is a song composed and performed by Irish singer Johnny Logan, which became the winner of the Eurovision Song Contest 1987 for . Logan had previously won with "What's Another Year?" in the 1980 contest and would go on to write the winner of the 1992 contest ("Why Me?" for Linda Martin for whom he had previously written "Terminal 3" in ). The song is usually sung by Bohemians at home matches in Dalymount Park.

Overview

The song was performed twentieth on the night, following 's Anne-Cathrine Herdorf & Bandjo with "En lille melodi" and preceding 's Novi Fosili with "Ja sam za ples". At the close of voting, it had received 172 points, placing 1st in a field of 22. After Logan had been proclaimed the winner with this song, he was overcome with emotion during the reprise and was unable to reach the high notes in this part of the song. As he had when he won in 1980 with "What's Another Year?", he shouted "I still love you, Ireland".

Lyrically, the song is a ballad sung from the point of view of a man whose love interest is leaving him for someone else ("from now on you'll be with someone else instead of me"). The singer pleads with his girlfriend to "touch, touch [him] the way you used to do" in order to leave him with good memories of their relationship, even as they "fill this memory / for the last time".
The chorus then tells the girl "don't say a word", as they prepare to part. Despite the sad nature of the parting, the singer says "I will know / though we're apart / we'll always be together", which implies some sort of optimism on his part. The music (also composed by Logan) is that of a typical Eurovision power ballad, with the final chorus being introduced by a chorus of backing singers (Joan Lea, Karen Black and Alain Pentony) before they are joined by Logan's voice again.

It was succeeded as Irish representative at the 1988 contest by Jump The Gun with "Take Him Home". "Hold Me Now" is regarded by many fans as one of the high points of the contest history, recently being voted the third-best song in Eurovision history (behind "Waterloo" and "Nel blu dipinto di blu").

Covers
The song has been covered by several performers, including a reggae version by Tanya Stephens. It has also been updated by Belgian rapper Kaye Styles as "Don't Cry". This cover also features Logan performing the chorus of the song at a slightly faster tempo than the traditional version. The late Macedonian superstar Toše Proeski covered this song during his concerts.

McDonald's advertising

The song was also used in an Irish advertising campaign launched by McDonald's toward the end of 2007. These ads feature Logan bursting into the room with a McDonald's bag in an effort to cheer a series of teens in humorous predicaments. Logan interrupts his singing to pose the question "Twisty Fries?" (among other products offered by McDonald's).

2001 version

In 2001, Logan released Reach for Me, with the first two tracks being revamped versions of his Eurovision winning songs which are titled in the album as "What's Another Year 2001" and "Hold Me Now 2001" in a revamped up-beat version. "Hold Me Now" from the album had a limited chart success in Denmark where it made it to #9 in the Hitlisten chart. It also made it to #54 in Swedish Sverigetopplistan Singles Chart.

Track list
"Hold Me Now 2001" (Radio Edit) (3:33)	
"Hold Me Now 2001" (Instrumental) (3:33)

2010 version
A decade later, Johnny Logan recorded yet a new version of both winning songs now titled "What's Another Year 2010" and "Hold Me Now 2010" in his studio album Nature of Love without releasing either as a single.

Charts

Weekly charts

Year-end charts

Certifications

References 

Epic Records singles
Johnny Logan (singer) songs
Eurovision songs of Ireland
Eurovision songs of 1987
Congratulations Eurovision songs
Eurovision Song Contest winning songs
1987 songs
Songs written by Johnny Logan (singer)
Irish Singles Chart number-one singles
Number-one singles in Israel